Gordon Reid defeated Stefan Olsson in the final, 6–1, 6–4 to win the inaugural gentlemen's singles wheelchair tennis title at the 2016 Wimbledon Championships.

Seeds

 Stéphane Houdet (semifinals)
 Joachim Gérard (semifinals)

Draw

Finals

References
WC Men's Singles

Men's Wheelchair Singles
Wimbledon Championship by year – Wheelchair men's singles